USNS Cesar Chavez (T-AKE-14), a Lewis and Clark-class dry cargo ship, is the first ship operated by the United States Navy to be named for Cesar Chavez (1927–1993), labor leader and civil rights activist. 
Chávez joined the Navy at the age of seventeen in 1944 during World War II, and served for two years.

Cesar Chavezs keel was laid down on 9 May 2011 by the National Steel and Shipbuilding Company (NASSCO) in San Diego.
The ship was launched on 5 May 2012.

Notes

External links

 

Lewis and Clark-class dry cargo ships
2012 ships
Cesar Chavez
Vessels involved in the search for Malaysia Airlines Flight 370